is a small asteroid, classified as a near-Earth object of the Apollo group, approximately  in diameter. On 11 August 2018, it was first observed by ATLAS at the Mauna Loa Observatory on Hawaii , when it passed  from the Earth. This is notable because it came within a tenth of the lunar distance, or 0.10 LD which is closer to Earth than satellites in a geostationary orbit.

Orbit and classification 

 orbits the Sun at a distance of 0.82–1.66 AU once every 17 months (503 days; semi-major axis of 1.24 AU). Its orbit has an eccentricity of 0.34 and an inclination of 9° with respect to the ecliptic.

See also 
 List of asteroid close approaches to Earth in 2018

References

External links
 Closest asteroid flyby of the year: 2018 PD20 flew past Earth at 0.09 LD
MPEC 2018-P79 : 2018 PD20
 
 

Minor planet object articles (unnumbered)
20180811
Discoveries by ATLAS